Helen Katherine Myers Sharsmith (August 26, 1905 – November 10, 1982) was an American biologist.

Biography 
Helen Sharsmith was born 1905 in Oakland, California.  She received an AB and MA from University of California, Berkeley in 1927 and 1928, then worked as a high school and junior college teacher. She met her future husband, Carl Sharsmith, while taking a class in the Yosemite Outdoor Field School in Yosemite National Park.  She and her husband married and both earned doctorates from University of California, Berkeley, hers in 1940.

Sharsmith was a research assistance at University of California and a biology teacher while working on her degree. Later, she worked as a biology assistant at the Carnegie Institution of Washington and a senior botanist at Berkeley, where she retired in 1969.

Sharsmith's dissertation was later published as a book, Flora of the Mount Hamilton Range of California (1945). This was the result of extensive field research in the area.  She also wrote Spring Wildflowers of the San Francisco Bay Region (1965).

The Sharsmiths had two children, John, named after John Muir, and a daughter Linnea, named after Carl Linnaeus.  They were later divorced.

Sharsmith died 1982 in Alameda County, California.

Legacy 
 Sharsmith's stickseed (Hackelia sharsmithii) — named for her husband by I.M. Johnston, but discovered by Sharsmith and her husband Carl Sharsmith at Mirror Lake after climbing Mount Whitney
 Sharsmith's Onion (Allium sharsmithiae) (Ownbey & Aase ex Traub) McNeal — Aliso or Allium fimbriatum S. Watson var. sharsmithiae Ownbey & Aase ex Traub.). Endemic to Mount Hamilton area of the Diablo Range in the southeastern San Francisco Bay Area.
 Sharsmith's harebell (Campanula sharsmithiae), or Mt. Hamilton Bellflower (N. Morin) — endemic to Mount Hamilton area of the Diablo Range in the southeastern San Francisco Bay Area.
 Sharsmith's draba (Draba sharsmithii), or Mount Whitney draba (Rollins and R.A. Price) — endemic to southern Sierra Crest in Mount Whitney area.

See also 
 O'Neill, Elizabeth Stone, Mountain Sage: The Life of Carl Sharsmith Yosemite Ranger/Naturalist 2d ed. (1996) .

References 

American biologists
Botanists active in California
1905 births
1982 deaths
American women botanists
American women biologists
Botanists with author abbreviations
Scientists from California
University of California, Berkeley alumni
People from Oakland, California
20th-century American botanists
20th-century American women scientists